Pedro Carvalhosa Empis (born 1 February 1997) is a Portuguese footballer who plays as a left-back for U.D. Leiria.

Club career
Born in Lisbon, Empis joined local Sporting CP's youth system at the age of 14, from neighbouring G.D. Estoril Praia. On 6 August 2016 he made his senior debut with the former's B team, playing the full 90 minutes in a 1–2 home loss against Portimonense S.C. in the Segunda Liga.

For the 2017–18 season, Empis was loaned to Académica de Coimbra of the same league. After cutting ties with Sporting, he returned to Estoril.

Empis signed a two-year contract with Spanish Primera División RFEF club Cultural y Deportiva Leonesa on 23 June 2021.

International career
Empis won his only cap for Portugal at under-21 level on 11 October 2016 at the age of 19, as a second-half substitute for Ricardo Horta in the 7–1 away rout of Liechtenstein in the 2017 UEFA European Championship qualifiers.

References

External links

Portuguese League profile 

1997 births
Living people
Portuguese footballers
Footballers from Lisbon
Association football defenders
Liga Portugal 2 players
Campeonato de Portugal (league) players
Sporting CP B players
Associação Académica de Coimbra – O.A.F. players
G.D. Estoril Praia players
U.D. Leiria players
Primera Federación players
Cultural Leonesa footballers
Portugal youth international footballers
Portugal under-21 international footballers
Portuguese expatriate footballers
Expatriate footballers in Spain
Portuguese expatriate sportspeople in Spain